"Costa Mesa Hates Me" is a song by Supernova, released as their fourth single on 7" by Tres Hombres Musica in 1994.

Tracks one and three were included on the 2001 compilation CD Pop as a Weapon.

The song was covered by The Vandals in 1996 on the Assorted Jellybeans/Vandals 7" split.

Track listing
All lyrics written by Supernova.

Side A:
Costa Mesa Hates Me
Side B:
Cool Job
Costa Mesa Hates Me Pt. 2

Personnel
Art Mitchell - Vocals, bass guitar
Hayden 'Hank' Thais - Guitar, vocals
Dave Collins - Drums, vocals

Supernova (American band) songs
1994 singles
Costa Mesa, California
1994 songs